Roosh Bipinbhai Kalaria (born 16 January 1993) is an Indian cricketer. He is a right-hand batsman and left-arm medium-fast bowler who plays for Gujarat in domestic cricket. He has played for the India Under-19 cricket team in the 2012 ICC Under-19 Cricket World Cup.

He was the leading wicket-taker for Gujarat in the 2018–19 Ranji Trophy, with 27 dismissals in eight matches. In the quarter-final match against Kerala, he took a hat-trick. In October 2019, he was named in India B's squad for the 2019–20 Deodhar Trophy.

References

External links

Living people
1993 births
Indian cricketers
Gujarat cricketers
Gujarati people